Silvano Signori (4 December 1929 – 17 February 2003) was an Italian politician who served as a Senator for five legislatures (1972–1992) and Undersecretary of State for Defence in the Craxi I and Craxi II Cabinets.

References

1929 births
2003 deaths
Politicians from Grosseto
Italian Socialist Party politicians
Senators of Legislature VI of Italy
Senators of Legislature VII of Italy
Senators of Legislature VIII of Italy
Senators of Legislature IX of Italy
Senators of Legislature X of Italy